Paul Arnold (born 28 April 1968 in Morriston, Swansea, Wales) is a former Welsh international rugby union rugby player. A Lock Forward, Arnold played club rugby for Swansea and for the Welsh national team, winning 16 caps and scoring a total of 8 points.

References

External links
 WRU profile
 Swansea profile
 Sporting Heroes profile

1968 births
Living people
Rugby union locks
Rugby union players from Morriston
Wales international rugby union players
Welsh rugby union players